IPSC Sri Lanka is the Sri Lankan association for practical shooting under the International Practical Shooting Confederation.

References 

Regions of the International Practical Shooting Confederation
Sports organisations of Sri Lanka